Captain Cuts is a songwriting, record production and remix team based in Los Angeles. The trio is composed of Ben Berger, Ryan McMahon and Ryan Rabin (son of Trevor), drummer and producer of the band Grouplove. Collectively they have produced and co-written songs for artists such as Walk the Moon ("Shut Up and Dance"), Bebe Rexha ("I Got You"), Halsey, The Chainsmokers, Grouplove, Tove Lo, LÉON, Keith Urban, and Marina, among others.

In December 2013, they signed a joint venture deal with Warner Bros Records to form Cuts Records, a record label through which to sign, produce and develop new artists.

In 2016, they signed a record deal with Epic Records as artists and released their first single "Love Like We Used To" on October 14.

Background and career
Berger, McMahon and Rabin grew up in Los Angeles, going to the same high school and involved in the music scene. They first wrote together several years later, and when their creative dynamic felt natural after the first song, they continued working together, eventually forming Captain Cuts and becoming long-term collaborators. Captain Cuts began performing DJ sets on a recurring basis at Emo Nite LA in 2016.

The team was a featured artist on the 2018 NOTD and Felix Jaehn single "So Close", with a music video starring Sports Illustrated Swimsuit cover girl Camille Kostek.

Discography

Singles

As lead artist
 "Love Like We Used To" (2016) 
 "Cocaina" (2017) 
 "House Party" (2017) 
 "Do You Think About Me" (2018) 
 "Summertime Love" (2019) 
 "Heat" (2019) 
 "Stuck in My Head" (2020)

As featured artist
 "So Close" (2018) 
 "On Air" (2022)

Songwriting and production credits

Singles

Full discography

Remixes
 Walk the Moon - "One Foot"
 Grouplove – "Colours"
 Icona Pop – "Manners"
 Superhumanoids – "Mirrors" (Captain Cuts & Grouplove Remix)
 Britney Spears – "I Wanna Go"
 Ellie Goulding – "Lights"
 Foster the People – "Pumped Up Kicks" (Captain Cuts & Grouplove Remix)
 Young The Giant – "Apartment"
 Marina and the Diamonds – "Radioactive"
 Outasight – "Tonight Is the Night"
 We Barbarians – "Headspace" (Captain Cuts & Grouplove Remix)
 Imagine Dragons – "Radioactive" (Captain Cuts & Grouplove Remix)
 American Authors – "Believer"
 Icona Pop – "All Night"
 The Wombats – "Your Body Is a Weapon" (Grouplove & Captain Cuts Remix)
 The Rubens – "My Gun" (Grouplove & Captain Cuts Remix)
 Grouplove – "Ways to Go"
 Smallpools – "Mason Jar" (Grouplove & Captain Cuts Remix)
 Gold Fields – "Dark Again" (Captain Cuts & Grouplove Remix)

Awards and nominations

References

Notes

Citations 

Record producers from California
Songwriting teams
Songwriters from California
Living people
Year of birth missing (living people)